There are nineteen stations in the G:link, a light rail system serving the Gold Coast in Queensland, Australia. The system consists of a single  line that opened with sixteen initial stations on 20 July 2014, with another three stations opening on 17 December 2017. It is operated under contract by Keolis Downer and funded jointly by local, state and federal governments.

Helensvale is the northern terminus of the system, connecting with Helensvale railway station, while Broadbeach South is the southern terminus. One station is located in Helensvale, two are located in Parkwood, seven stations are located in Southport, one is in Main Beach, six are in Surfers Paradise, and two are in Broadbeach. It takes 45 minutes to travel from one end of the line to the other. TransLink charges fares that increase as passengers travel through eight concentric zones radiating outward from the Brisbane central business district; all of the stations are located within zone 5. The system's average daily ridership is 21,000 as of February 2016. The most heavily trafficked station is Cavill Avenue, with an average 4,729 daily passengers in February 2016.

Eighteen of the stations are street-level open-air structures featuring passenger canopies, and one is underground. Eleven stations have side platforms and eight have an island platform. Seven stations offer transfers to TransLink bus services. Park and ride facilities are also available at Helensvale and Parkwood stations: during the construction of Stage 2, 1000 car park spaces were built at the new Parkwood station, while 400 new car park spaces were built at Helensvale, in addition to the 877 existing spaces there.

Following public consultation, a  southern extension that will terminate at the Gold Coast Airport is in the planning stages.

Stations

Stage 3 extension planned stations 
Stage 3 of the light rail will see the line extended 6.7kilometers south to Burleigh Heads, traveling down the median strip of the Gold Coast Highway, passing through key costal suburbs key development areas such as Nobby's Beach and Burleigh Heads. There will be 8 new stations, all built with the same design as the first two stages, however, there are no park'n'ride facilities like there were in stage 2. All stations on the extension configured as a central platform station, meaning that both north and southbound platforms are located in the middle, with tracks on either side. With signalised pedestrian crossing and all exits are wheelchair accessible.As of late 2022, construction has started on stage 3 and is expected to take 3 years to complete.

Mermaid Beach 
Mermaid Beach station is located in the suburb of the same name near the intersection of the Gold Coast Highway and Crescent Avenue and Montana Road. A number dining and retail options are located near the station along with parks and a medical centre.

Mermaid Beach South 
Located slightly south of Markeri Street, this station provides direct access to a number of holiday accommodations, a small retail precinct and residential dwellings are located only a short walk from the station.

Nobby Beach 
The station will be situated between Albicore Street and Dolphin Avenue on the Gold Coast Highway. It will serve the Nobby Beach retail precinct, and the beach is only a short walk away.

Miami North 
Miami North station will be on the corner of Paradise Avenue and the Gold Coast Highway, and will serve northern Miami and the Miami State High School.

Miami 
Miami station will be on the corner of Hythe Street and the Gold Coast Highway, serving Miami Beach and a number of holiday resorts.

Christine Avenue 
The station will be located on the corner of Christine Avenue and the Gold Coast Highway, on the southern side of Miami. Christine Avenue will serve a number of retail and dining venues, as well as the North Burleigh Surf Beach.

Second Avenue Burleigh 
This station will be on the corner of Second Avenue and the Gold Coast Highway, just north of Burleigh Heads. A number of holidays resorts are a short walk away, as well as Burleigh Heads State School.

Burleigh Heads 
The southern terminus of Burleigh Heads will be located at the junction of Goodwin Terrace and the Gold Coast Highway. It will serve the James Street retail and dining precinct, as well as Memorial Park, Justins Park, Burleigh Head National Park and Burleigh Heads Surf Beach. The station will offer bus connections to Varsity Lakes railway station and southern suburbs, including the Gold Coast Airport.

Potential extensions
Future extensions however are not expected to take place until after stage 4 is fully completed and further feasibility studies are undertaken.

Main Beach and The Spit
A branch line from Main Beach to The Spit was proposed in the Gold Coast City Council's 2031 transport plan, City Transport Strategy 2031. The council announced a number of potential route options in April 2017 and invited public comment. The time frame for construction remains undecided but is not expected to be completed until after the extension to the Gold Coast Airport.

Biggera Waters
The Gold Coast's council 2031 Transport plan published outlines a possible extension to Biggera Waters. The proposed line would branch off from the existing University Hospital light rail station, travelling north before terminating at Harbour Town Shopping Centre in the suburb of Biggera Waters. It is not expected for the line to be completed until after the extension to the Gold Coast Airport.

Bundall
The Gold Coast's council 2031 Transport plan published outlines a possible extension to Bundall. The proposed line would branch off from Cavill Avenue, travelling west for several kilometres before terminating in the suburb of Bundall. Stations may include Chevron Island, HOTA, Bundall Business District and Gold Coast Turf Club. It is not expected for the line to be completed until after the extension to the Gold Coast Airport.

Nerang
The Gold Coast's council 2031 Transport plan published outlines a possible extension to the Nerang. The proposed line would spur off from Broadbeach, travelling west along Hooker Boulevard and north along Nerang–Broadbeach Road before terminating at the Nerang railway station. Stations would include Mermaid Waters, Carrara Markets and Carrara Stadium.

Robina
A  Robina extension is proposed in the Gold Coast City Council's Light Rail southern Gold Coast publication. The proposed extension would branch off from Nobbys Beach and terminate at Robina railway station passing through Bond University, Market Square, Robina Town Centre and Robina Stadium. It is not expected for the line to be completed until after the extension to the Gold Coast Airport.

Varsity Lakes
The Light Rail southern Gold Coast  published by the Gold Coast City Council also outline a proposal extension to Varsity Lakes from Burleigh Heads. The extension would branch out from Burleigh Heads and follow Burleigh Connection Road, passing by Stocklands Burleigh Heads Shopping Centre and the light industrial areas of West Burleigh before terminating at Varsity Lakes railway station, providing a heavy rail connection. It is not expected for the line to be completed until after the extension to the Gold Coast Airport

Tweed Heads
On 19 February 2019, Tweed Heads MP Geoff Provest announced $1 million of funding towards strategic planning to extend the Gold Coast light rail system from the Gold Coast Airport to over the New South Wales border into Tweed Heads.

See also
 Transport on the Gold Coast, Queensland

Notes

References

External links

Public transport on the Gold Coast, Queensland
Queensland transport-related lists
Lists of railway stations in Australia
Lists of buildings and structures in Queensland
G:link stations